Angus is a suburb of Sydney in the state of New South Wales, Australia. Angus is north-west of Sydney City in the local government area of Blacktown.

History 
Angus is situated in the Darug traditional Aboriginal country. Angus was approved as a suburb on 7 September 2020 and gazetted on 6 November 2020. Prior to the suburb's creation, the area was part of Marsden Park and Riverstone.

The origin of the suburb name is from the name of a former Shire President of the Blacktown Shire Council in 1917–1920.

References 

Suburbs of Sydney
City of Blacktown